Ben Rhodes may refer to:

 Ben Rhodes (footballer) (born 1983), English footballer
 Ben Rhodes (racing driver) (born 1997), American racing driver
 Ben Rhodes (sailor) (born 1981), British sailor
 Ben Rhodes (White House staffer) (born 1977), deputy national security advisor and Assistant to President Obama